Isekai Quartet is a Japanese anime series that serves as a chibi-style crossover between the light novel series KonoSuba, Overlord, Re:Zero − Starting Life in Another World, and The Saga of Tanya the Evil, all published by Kadokawa Corporation. The series is written and directed by Minoru Ashina, with character designs by Minoru Takehara, who also serves as chief animation director. The series is animated by Studio Puyukai. It aired from April 9 to June 25, 2019. The series ran 12 episodes. Funimation has licensed the series and is streaming it in both Japanese and English. On April 23, 2019, it was added to Crunchyroll's streaming library as well. Satoshi Hino, Jun Fukushima, Yūsuke Kobayashi and Aoi Yūki perform the opening theme song , while Yumi Hara, Sora Amamiya, Rie Takahashi and Aoi Yūki perform the ending theme song .



Episode list

Notes

References

External links
  
 

2019 Japanese television seasons